Doc's Pass Wilderness is a  wilderness area in the US state of Utah.  It was designated March 30, 2009, as part of the Omnibus Public Land Management Act of 2009.  Located adjacent to Nevada in the northwestern corner of Washington County, it protects a portion of the Bull Valley Mountains and the watershed of five miles of a perennial, free-flowing stream within Beaver Dam Wash.  This stream provides habitat for a wide range of native fish, and the riparian zone supports numerous mammals.

Doc's Pass Wilderness is located near Cougar Canyon Wilderness and Slaughter Creek Wilderness, only separated by a road, and is part of the extended Zion Wilderness landscape.

See also
 List of U.S. Wilderness Areas
 Wilderness Act

References

External links
 
 

Wilderness areas of Utah
Protected areas of Washington County, Utah
Bureau of Land Management areas in Utah